is a Japanese actress and singer.

History
In 1987, she played a lead in the Japanese film Drifting Classroom, which was based on a popular horror manga series by Kazuo Umezu.  Her music album Silver Doll and her nude photo book The Younger Sister of Summer  were released almost simultaneously with the release of Drifting Classroom.  Those media led her to considerable fame in Japan in the late 1980s. In 1994, she retired from entertainment industry and got married.

In 2016, Aiko Asano did an interview to look back over her experience; she said that her manager wanted her to do the nude photobook The Younger Sister of Summer and she didn't really want to do it, but the photographer tried his very best to make her feel more comfortable during the photoshoots; eventually, she became more proud of the nude book The Younger Sister of Summer as she grew older. Aiko Asano also said that she worked very hard to study English for starring in Drifting Classroom.

References

External links

i-dic.dorachan.com entry (Japanese-language page)

1969 births
Living people
Japanese women pop singers
20th-century Japanese actresses
Japanese female idols
Japanese female adult models
Singers from Tokyo